Sadia Jahan Prova is a Bangladeshi model and television actress.

Personal life
Prova married actor Ziaul Faruq Apurba in August 2010. The couple got divorced in February 2011. She married Mahmud in 2012 but the marriage ended up in a mutual divorce in 2014.

Work 
Television drama

Television drama serials
 House Full
 Dainik Tolpar
 Eit Kather Khasa
 Aporajita
 Aim In Life
 Porer Meye
 Sikander Box Ekhon Cox's Bazare
 Chan Biriyani

References

External links
 
 

Living people
Bangladeshi film actresses
Bangladeshi female models
Bangladeshi television actresses
21st-century Bangladeshi actresses
Year of birth missing (living people)
Place of birth missing (living people)